Operational Flight Trainer (OFT) is a training device, often a flight simulator, intended for general flight training as opposed to specialist tactics and weapons training. An OFT often has a motion platform in order to enable realistic instrument flying (IF) and other procedural training.  OFT is a term used particularly by the US Military.  A related term is Operational Flight and Tactics Trainer (OFTT), a device more capable than an OFT and designed for tactics training as well.

Flight training